Bisin (also spelled Biseen) is a village in northwestern Syria, administratively part of the Hama Governorate, located southwest of Hama. Nearby localities include Billin to the north, al-Muaa to the northeast, Deir al-Fardis to the east, Mousa al-Houla to the southeast, Tell Dahab and Houla to the south, Aqrab and Baarin to the southwest, al-Bayyadiyah to the west and al-Suwaydah to the northwest. According to the Syria Central Bureau of Statistics, Bisin had a population of 3,224 in the 2004 census. Its inhabitants are predominantly Alawites.

References

Bibliography

 

Populated places in Hama District
Alawite communities in Syria